Milind Kamble is an Indian entrepreneur notable for establishing Dalit Indian Chamber of Commerce and Industry (DICCI) and working for Dalit entrepreneurs and Dalit businesses. He received Padma Shri, India's fourth highest civilian honour in 2013.

References 

Recipients of the Padma Shri
Dalit
Year of birth missing (living people)
Living people